Mortal Kombat: Annihilation is a 1997 American martial arts fantasy film directed by John R. Leonetti in his directorial debut. Based on the Mortal Kombat video game franchise, it is the second installment in the Mortal Kombat film series and a sequel to the original 1995 film, of which Leonetti served as cinematographer. Largely an adaptation of the video game Mortal Kombat 3 (1995), Annihilation follows Liu Kang and his allies as they attempt to stop the malevolent Shao Kahn from conquering Earthrealm. It stars Robin Shou as Liu, Talisa Soto as Kitana, James Remar as Rayden, Sandra Hess as Sonya Blade, Lynn Red Williams as Jax, and Brian Thompson as Kahn. Only Shou and Soto reprise their roles, with the rest of the characters recast from the previous film.

Released to theaters by New Line Cinema on November 21, 1997, Mortal Kombat: Annihilation was panned by critics, with criticism for its story, characters, and special effects. It was also a commercial failure, grossing $51 million against a $30 million budget. Due to the film's poor critical and commercial response, a direct sequel was cancelled. A third Mortal Kombat film languished in development hell for nearly two decades until the series was rebooted with a 2021 installment.

Plot
The Outworld emperor Shao Kahn opens a portal to Earthrealm and has resurrected Queen Sindel, Princess Kitana's long-deceased mother, to facilitate his invasion. Thunder god Rayden and Earthrealm warriors Liu Kang, Sonya Blade, and Johnny Cage try to defend themselves, but Kahn kills Cage. The Earthrealm warriors retreat to seek allies.

Sonya Blade enlists the help of her Special Forces partner, Major Jackson "Jax" Briggs, she finds him, but the two are attacked by the Cyber Ninja Cyrax, and a group of Kahn's Extermination Squad, but Sonya and Jax emerge victorious, later on they split up, Sonya then finds a mud clearing with a gargoyle of a monster, then she is attacked by the female assassin Mileena and they fight, Sonya defeats Mileena, then the Gargoyle Monster comes to life to eat Sonya but Jax saves her in time and defeats the monster. Meanwhile, Kitana and Liu search for a Native American shaman named Nightwolf, who seemingly knows the key to defeating Kahn, but are then attacked by the Cyber Ninja Smoke and are saved by Sub-Zero. Later, Scorpion appears and fights Sub-Zero and then kidnaps Kitana.

Rayden meets with the Elder Gods and asks them why Kahn was allowed to break the tournament rules and force his way into Earthrealm, and how he can be stopped. One says that reuniting Kitana with her mother, Sindel, is the key to breaking Kahn's hold on Earthrealm, but another Elder God insists that the defeat of Kahn himself is the solution. Rayden is then asked by the Elder Gods about his feelings and obligations towards the mortals, and what he would be willing to do to ensure their survival.

Liu finds Nightwolf, who teaches him about the power of the Animality, a form of shapeshifting which utilizes the caster's strengths and abilities. To achieve the mindset needed to acquire this power, Liu must pass three tests. The first is a trial of his self-esteem, courage, and focus. The second comes in the form of temptation, which manifests itself in the form of Jade, a mysterious warrior who attempts to seduce Liu and offers her assistance after he resists her advances. Liu accepts Jade's offer and takes her with him to the Elder Gods' temple, where he and his friends meet with Rayden. The third test is never revealed.

The Earthrealm warriors learn that Rayden has sacrificed his immortality to freely fight alongside them. Together, they infiltrate Outworld to rescue Kitana and reunite her with Sindel in hopes of restoring her soul and closing the Outworld portal to Earth. Liu rescues Kitana while fighting Baraka and Sheeva, while the others incapacitate Sindel. However, Sindel remains under Kahn's control and escapes during an ambush. Jade reveals herself to be a double agent sent by Kahn to disrupt the heroes' plans. Kahn feeds Jade to the Gargoyle Monster for her failure. Rayden reveals that Shao Kahn is his brother and that the former Elder God Shinnok is their father. He realizes that Shinnok is supporting Kahn. Rayden and the Earthrealm warriors make their way to Kahn, Sindel, and his remaining generals Motaro and Ermac. Shinnok demands that Rayden submit to him and restore their broken family, at the expense of his mortal friends. Rayden refuses and is killed by an energy blast from Shao Kahn.

Jax, Sonya, and Kitana emerge victorious over Kahn's generals. Liu struggles with Kahn. Liu's Animality proves effective, exposing a cut to Kahn that proves he is now mortal, as a consequence of his breaking the sacred rules. Shinnok attempts to intervene and kill Liu on Kahn's behalf, but two of the Elder Gods arrive, having uncovered Shinnok's treachery. They declare that the fate of Earth shall be decided in Mortal Kombat. Liu defeats Kahn, and Shinnok is banished to the Netherrealm. Earthrealm reverts to its former state. With Kahn's hold over Sindel broken, she reunites with Kitana. Rayden is revived by the Elder Gods, who bestow upon him his father's former position. Before departing to the immortal realm, he enjoins the Earthrealm warriors to be there for one another. The Earthrealm warriors return home.

Cast

Production
Mortal Kombat: Annihilation is loosely based on the 1995 video game Mortal Kombat 3, while featuring the character roster of Ultimate Mortal Kombat 3. There were also plot elements from Mortal Kombat 4, but these scenes were cut from the final theatrical version. While the original attracted casual moviegoers as well as gamers, Annihilation catered exclusively to the games' fans. Producer Lawrence Kasanoff said he was trying to make the film "even more spectacular than the first movie, which earned a healthy $73 million in the U.S. Annihilation is three times more ambitious than Mortal Kombat. Our theme for the sequel is to shoot for more—more fights, more special effects, more Outworld, more everything."

Filming began in the first quarter of 1996. Part of the movie was filmed on location at Parys Mountain on the island of Anglesey, off the coast of Wales (incorrectly listed as being part of England in the closing credits). Other filming locations included London, Jordan, and Thailand. Though Annihilation attempted to continue in the style of the first movie, the cast of returning characters from the original was almost completely overhauled; only Robin Shou (Liu Kang) and Talisa Soto (Kitana) reprised their roles, while the only other actor to return was Keith Cooke (Reptile in the first film) as Sub-Zero. Stephen Painter and Neill Gorton provided some of the props for the film. J. J. Perry replaced Chris Casamassa as Scorpion, as Casamassa chose to do Batman & Robin instead.

The French release of the movie was known as Mortal Kombat: Destruction Finale (Final Destruction), while the Italian release was titled Mortal Kombat: Distruzione Totale (Total Destruction). The film's novelization by Jerome Preisler was published through Tor Books.

Thai actor and martial artist Tony Jaa was a stunt double for Robin Shou in the film.

Music

Mortal Kombat: Annihilation is the soundtrack to the film. The Mortal Kombat theme was composed by Praga Khan and Oliver Adams. The soundtrack was released on October 28, 1997 by TVT Records.

Though this being not mentioned, "Megalomaniac" appears in its single edit (shortened to 4:19 while it lasts 6:07 in its complete version), and "Fire" appears in a slightly shortened version (cut to 3:14 while its single and album versions last 3:31).

Reception

Box office
Mortal Kombat: Annihilation was released on November 21, 1997, and its opening weekend take was $16 million, enough for a number-one debut at the box office. It grossed $35 million domestically and made over $51 million worldwide.

Critical response
The website's critics consensus states, "With its shallow characters, low budget special effects, and mindless fight scenes, Mortal Kombat - Annihilation offers minimal plot development and manages to underachieve the low bar set by its predecessor." On Metacritic it has a weighted average score of 11 out of 100, based on 12 critics, indicating an "overwhelming dislike." Audiences polled by CinemaScore gave the film an average grade of "C+" on an A+ to F scale.

Jason Gibner of Allmovie wrote, "Whereas the first film was a guilty schlock pleasure, this sequel is an exercise in the art of genuinely beautiful trash cinema." Marjorie Baumgarten of the Austin Chronicle opined that it was "nothing more than a perpetual chain of elaborately choreographed fight sequences that ... are linked together by the most flimsy and laughable of plot elements." Owen Gleiberman of Entertainment Weekly gave the film a "D−" rating, calling it "abysmal" and "incoherent." R.L. Shaffer of IGN wrote in 2011: "Mortal Kombat: Annihilation is a bad movie. No way around it. Over the years, however, it has evolved into a cult hit of sorts, playing as an unintentional comedy – a spoof of the early video game movies and their painfully obvious cash-in mentality."

In separate 2012 interviews, Mortal Kombat co-creators Ed Boon and John Tobias selected Annihilation as their personal worst moments in the history of their work on the franchise.

In an interview for Luke Owen’s book, Lights, Camera, Game Over, Producer Lawrence Kasinoff revealed the film was released unfinished. “I’m telling you the effects in that movie are not the final effects.” Kasanoff admits. “I never anticipated that someone would take the movie and go, ‘it’s good enough’. We weren’t done. We never finished that movie. But the studio said, ‘we don’t care’. We sacrificed quality for business.”

Other media

Novelization
Novelizations of both Mortal Kombat movies were written by Martin Delrio and Jerome Preisler.

Cancelled sequel
Robin Shou's original Mortal Kombat contract was a three-picture deal, and Threshold Entertainment's production on a second sequel was initially scheduled to commence shortly after the release of Annihilation, but it was shelved due to Annihilation's poor reception and disappointing box-office performance. Attempts to produce a third film since then have remained stuck in development hell, with numerous script rewrites and storyline, cast, and crew changes. A November 2001 poll on the official Mortal Kombat website hosted by Threshold asked fans which characters they believed would die in the third movie. The 2005 destruction of New Orleans by Hurricane Katrina greatly affected one of the film's planned shooting locations. In June 2009, a bankruptcy court lawsuit saw Lawrence Kasanoff suing Midway Games while mentioning that a third film was in the works. Warner Bros. (which became the parent company of New Line Cinema in 2008, after over a decade of both operating as separate divisions of Time Warner) ended up purchasing most of Midway's assets, including Mortal Kombat.

See also
 List of films based on video games

References

External links
 
 

1997 films
1990s action films
1997 fantasy films
1997 martial arts films
American martial arts films
American fantasy action films
American sequel films
American films with live action and animation
Films about parallel universes
Films directed by John R. Leonetti
Films produced by Lawrence Kasanoff
Films scored by George S. Clinton
Films shot in Jordan
Films shot in Thailand
Films shot in Wales
Live-action films based on video games
Martial arts fantasy films
Annihilation
New Line Cinema films
Ninja films
1997 directorial debut films
1990s English-language films
1990s American films